Kumasi Sports Academy Ladies Football Club is a Ghanaian professional women's football club based in Kumasi in the Ashanti Region of Ghana. The club features in the Ghana Women’s Premier League. Their rivals are Supreme Ladies and Fabulous Ladies.

Grounds 
The club plays their home matches at the Okese Park in Ejisu.

References

External links 

 Official Website
 Kumasi Sports Academy Ladies FC on Twitter

Women's football clubs in Ghana